Mary Lee Burrows (née McCauley; August 27, 1932 - October 23, 2018) was an American politician who was a member of the Oregon House of Representatives.  She is an alumnus of Northwest Christian University and former secretary for the California Republican Assembly. Burrows also was the chair for the Lane County campaigns of Senator Bob Packwood and Governor Tom McCall in the 1967 and 1970 elections, respectively.

References

1932 births
2018 deaths
Republican Party members of the Oregon House of Representatives
Politicians from Eugene, Oregon
Bushnell University alumni
People from Rooks County, Kansas